Dunlop is a surname, originating in Ayrshire, Scotland. Notable people with the surname include:

 Andrew Dunlop, Baron Dunlop (born 1959), British politician
 Andy Dunlop (born 1972), Scottish guitarist
 Beveridge C. Dunlop (1879–1961), New York politician
 Bill Dunlop (born 1963), Canadian boxer
 Blake Dunlop (born 1953), Canadian ice-hockey player 
 Bob Dunlop (1945–2000), Australian boxer of the 1960s
 Bob Dunlop (footballer) (born 1935), Australian rules footballer
 Boyd Lee Dunlop (1926–2013), American jazz pianist
 Brian Dunlop (born 1938), Australian artist
 Charles Dunlop (1870–1911), Scottish cricketer who played for Somerset
 Daniel Nicol Dunlop (1868–1935), British anthroposophist and electrical industry executive
 David Colin Dunlop (1897–1968), Dean of Lincoln, Bishop of Jarrow
 David Dunlop (cricketer) (1855–1898), Scottish-born cricketer in New Zealand
 Sir Derrick Dunlop (1902–1980), Scottish physician and founder of the "Dunlop Committee" on drug abuse
 Douglas Dunlop, Scottish teacher and missionary; consultant (1880s–1919) to the Egyptian minister of education
 Douglas Morton Dunlop (1909–1987), Scottish-American professor of history and orientalist
 Ed Dunlop (born 1968), British thoroughbred racehorse trainer
 Edward Arunah Dunlop (1876–1934), Canadian politician
 Prof. Ernest Dunlop (1893–1969), Scottish bacteriologist
 Fuchsia Dunlop, English writer and chef, granddaughter of David Colin Dunlop
 Garfield Dunlop, Canadian politician (currently opposition chief whip)
 Graham Dunlop (born 1976), Scottish field hockey player
 Henry Dunlop of Craigton (1799–1867), Lord Provost of Glasgow
 Jack Dunlop "Three Fingered Jack" (c.1872 – February 24, 1900) American outlaw
 James Dunlop (disambiguation), several people
 James Dunlop (1793–1848), Scottish astronomer.
 James Dunlop (judge) (1793–1872), United States federal judge
 James Dunlop (astronomer), Scottish astronomer and academic
 James Dunlop of Dunlop (1759–1832), British Army officer, MP for Kirkcudbright Stewartry
 James Dunlop (footballer) (1870–1892), Scottish footballer (St Mirren and Scotland)
 James Dunlop (rugby union) (1854–1923), Scotland rugby union player
 Sir James Dunlop, 2nd Baronet (1830–1858), of the Dunlop baronets
 Janette Dunlop (1891–1971), Scottish physicist and teacher
 Jim Dunlop Sr, founder of Dunlop Manufacturing
 Joan Dunlop, (1934–2012), British and American women's health advocate
 Joey Dunlop (1952–2000), Northern Ireland motorcycle racer
 John Dunlop (disambiguation), several persons, including:
John B. Dunlop (born 1942), American political scientist
John Boyd Dunlop (1840–1921), inventor of the pneumatic tyre, founded Dunlop rubber company
John Colin Dunlop (1785–1842), Scottish historian
John Dunlop (racehorse trainer) (1939–2018), British horse-racing trainer
John Gibb Dunlop (1844–1913), Scottish engineer and shipbuilder
John T. Dunlop (Virginia politician) (1842–1907), American politician
John Thomas Dunlop (1914–2003), American administrator, US Secretary of Labor
John Dunlop of Dunlop (1806–1839), British Member of Parliament for Kilmarnock Burghs
John Dunlop (American football) (1874–1957), American football coach
John Dunlop (chess player) (born 1886), New Zealand chess champion
John Dunlop (curler) (born 1975), American curler
John Dunlop (Unionist politician) (1910–1996), MP for Mid Ulster
John Dunlop (minister) (born 1939), Irish Presbyterian minister
John Dunlop (writer) (1755–1820), Scottish songwriter and writer
 Juliet Dunlop, British television journalist
 Lesley Dunlop (born 1956), British actress
 Marion Wallace Dunlop (1864–1942), British suffragette
 Michael Dunlop (born 1988), Northern Ireland motorcycle racer
 Michael Dunlop (footballer, born 1957), Scottish football forward
 Michael Dunlop (footballer, born 1982), Scottish football defender
 Sir Nathaniel Dunlop (1830–1919) Glasgow shipowner and philanthropist
 Nicholas Dunlop (born 1956), climate activist from New Zealand
 Penelope Jane Dunlop (born 1960), South African entertainer also known as PJ Powers
 Robert Dunlop (1960–2008), Northern Ireland motorcycle racer
 Robert Graham Dunlop (1790–1841), British naval officer and office-holder in Upper Canada
 Robert Dunlop (historian) (1861–1930), English historian
 Ronald Ossory Dunlop (1894–1973), Irish artist
 Sibyl Dunlop (1889–1968), British jewellery designer, Arts and Crafts work of the 1920s and 1930s
 Sir Thomas Dunlop, 1st Baronet (1855–1938), Scottish businessman
 Weary Dunlop (Sir Ernest Edward Dunlop, 1907–1993), Australian surgeon and prisoner of war hero
 William Dunlop (disambiguation), several people named William and Billy

See also
 Dunlap (surname)

External links
 www.clandunlop.com

English-language surnames